Kudzu, a climbing, coiling, and trailing vine in the genus Pueraria, native to southern Japan and southeast China

Kudzu may also refer to:

Kudzu (comic strip), Doug Marlette's daily comic strip created in May 1981
Kudzu (newspaper), a newspaper published in Jackson, Mississippi starting in September 1968
Kudzu (computer daemon), a Red Hat Linux hardware probing library
Kudzu bug, a type of stinkbug and pest to crops - the Megacopta cribraria. Originally in India and China but recently infesting the south eastern United States
Kudzu.com, advertising service
Kudzu, a series of American sports racing cars built by Jim Downing